The western chat-tanager (Calyptophilus tertius) is a Vulnerable species of passerine bird belonging to the family Calyptophilidae. It is endemic to the island of Hispaniola which is shared by the Dominican Republic and Haiti.

Taxonomy and systematics

The western chat-tanager shares its genus with the eastern chat-tanager (C. frugivorus), and was previously treated as a subspecies of it. There is a high degree of divergence between the two in mitochondrial DNA and intron sequences. Speciation is likely to have occurred on two ancient islands, which later fused to form present-day Hispaniola. The genus was long included in the family Thraupidae, the "true" tanagers, but it was moved in 2017. The western chat-tanager is monotypic.

Description

It has a long bill and tail, so it somewhat resembles a mockingbird's shape. The sexes have the same plumage. Adults have a dark olive-brown head, with a blackish crown and a small rusty spot between the eye and bill. The rest of their upperparts are dark reddish brown. Their throat and underparts are white, with a heavy wash of grayish brown on the flanks and lower belly.

Distribution and habitat

The western chat-tanager is found throughout Hispaniola's highest mountain ranges, in southwestern Haiti's Massif de la Hotte and Chaîne de la Selle and the adjacent Sierra de Bahoruco in the southwestern Dominican Republic. It inhabits broadleaf forest and dense brushy areas, especially in ravines and near water.

Behavior

Movement

The western chat-tanager is a year-round resident throughout its range. It is secretive and usually encountered on or near the ground.

Feeding

The feeding behavior and diet of the western chat-tanager are not well known. Both are apparently similar to those of the eastern chat-tanager. That species forages on or near the ground, usually in pairs. Its diet is mostly insects and other invertebrates with a small amount of fruit.

Breeding

The western chat-tanager's breeding season is thought to be May to July. Only two nests have been described. One held two eggs; after hatching, both parents provisioned the nestlings.

Vocalization

Both sexes of the western chat-tanager sing, usually at dawn. Their song is described as a buzzy "wee-chee-chee-chee". Their calls include a "chip-chip" and a "tick, tick, tick, tick...".

Status

The IUCN has assessed the western chat-tanager as Vulnerable. It has a small range and its estimated population of 6700 to 13,300 mature individuals is believed to be decreasing. The main threats are logging and conversion of habitat to agriculture. Nest predation, thought to be mainly by black (Rattus rattus) and brown rats (R. norvegicus) and feral cats, is significant. It is "fairly numerous locally" in both countries and occurs in some protected areas, which, in Haiti, are only nominally supported.

References

Further reading
Raffaele, Herbert; Wiley, James; Garrido, Orlando; Keith, Allan & Raffaele, Janis (2003) Birds of the West Indies, Christopher Helm, London.

western chat-tanager
Endemic birds of the Caribbean
Birds of Haiti
Endemic birds of Hispaniola
Birds of Hispaniola
Birds of the Dominican Republic
western chat-tanager
Taxa named by Alexander Wetmore